Metzgeriites is a genus of fossil liverwort.

References 

Metzgeriales
Liverwort genera
Prehistoric plant genera